Ellen Grove railway station is a proposed railway station on the Springfield line in Queensland, Australia. It  would serve the Brisbane suburb of Ellen Grove and would be located between Richlands and Springfield stations.

When the Springfield line was built in 2013, provision was made for the station, but to date no concrete plans exist to build it.

References

External links
Darra to Springfield Project Plan Queensland Rail

Proposed railway stations in Australia
Railway stations in Brisbane